The Charge of the Light Brigade is a 1968 British DeLuxe Color satirical war film made by Woodfall Film Productions and distributed by United Artists, depicting parts of the Crimean War and the eponymous charge. It was directed by Tony Richardson and produced by Neil Hartley. Its animated credits and linking passages were created by Richard Williams, drawing on the satirical use of Victorian-era jingoistic images. This film features Richardson's daughters Natasha and Joely in their debuts.

Plot 
The film is about the folly of war, and the poor state of the British Army and its leadership during the Crimean War (1853–1856). Britain had not fought in a European theatre since the Battle of Waterloo in 1815, and the army had become sclerotic and bound by bureaucracy. Tactical and logistical methodology had not advanced in forty years, and the whole ethos of the army was bound in outmoded social values.

The anti-hero is a relatively competent officer, Captain Louis Nolan (David Hemmings). A veteran of the British Indian Army, Nolan is unusual in the hierarchy of his day both for having combat experience and for having acquired his commission through merited promotion as opposed to purchase. As such he regards many of his colleagues, who are mostly aristocratic dilettantes casual about squandering their subordinates' lives, with contempt.

Nolan's superior is the gruff Lord Cardigan (Trevor Howard), who treats the regiment under his command as his personal property and who dislikes Nolan as an "Indian" officer with a native Indian servant. Cardigan's men are typical of the common soldiers of their day; though reasonably well-equipped – compared with the Russians – they are also poorly trained and supplied. They endure squalid living conditions and are punished mercilessly for the slightest missteps in their duties. Nolan soon gets into a highly publicised feud with Cardigan, who is angry at him for ordering Moselle wine at a banquet where all guests were to drink champagne.

British forces are led by Lord Raglan (John Gielgud), a Waterloo veteran and an amiable, vague-minded man who proves a poor commander. Despite having been a disciple of the recently deceased Duke of Wellington for decades, he has not his military flair. As campaign preparations begin he is preoccupied with a bad mistake he made while allotting commands, requiring Lord Cardigan to lead the Light Cavalry Brigade under his equally unpleasant arch-rival and brother-in-law Lord Lucan (Harry Andrews), who has been appointed to command the Cavalry Division. Captain Nolan, enlisted as Raglan's aide, is glad to get away from Britain; it gives him an escape from the morally uneasy affair he has been having with Clarissa Morris (Vanessa Redgrave), the wife of his best friend William (Mark Burns). Also travelling with the British command is the 8th Hussars' paymaster's wife named Fanny Duberly (Jill Bennett), who wants to observe battle first-hand (and be near Lord Cardigan, with whom she is infatuated).

Britain and its ally France travel to the Crimea, where they march inland to attack the strategically important city of Sevastopol. Along the way the British forces are ravaged by cholera, an occurrence met with palpable indifference by their commanders. Captain Nolan, although no friend of his subordinates, is frightened to see the army's organisation fall apart as men are consumed by the disease. When the outbreak passes, British and French forces win at Alma, but Lord Raglan refuses to allow the cavalry to press the advantage, so concerned is he with keeping the cavalry as an undamaged reserve. As a result, the Russians reinforce the road to Sebastopol, necessitating a series of further battles before the British even reach the city. Back in England the press lies that the city is captured and Russia's government humbled. As the war progresses Lord Cardigan retires nightly to the yacht he keeps on the coastline to hold formal dinners, at one of which he seduces Mrs. Duberly.

Captain Nolan has been growing increasingly exasperated at the ineptitude of Raglan and the other officers, which has caused needless death and delay at every step. His emotions reach a tipping point when at the Battle of Balaclava, a Russian raiding party captures an improperly defended British fortification, carrying away several pieces of artillery. Lord Raglan is slow to respond, and Nolan demands he take steps to recover the valuable equipment. Raglan issues badly worded orders, that the cavalry leaders misinterpret. The British cavalrymen are in a valley that branches off in two directions; one contains the escaping raiders, the other an artillery battery and a sizeable reserve of Russian cavalry. Lord Raglan did not bother to mention this in his order, since the lie of the land is obvious from his high vantage point. Cardigan, at his lower level, can only see the valley with the cannons, and assumes that he must charge into this. When he queries the order, Nolan loses his temper and gestures vaguely with his arm, shouting "There, my Lord, is your enemy and there are your guns!" (these, or something close to them, were his actual words). As the cavalry advances into cannon fire Nolan – who has gained permission from his friend Morris to ride with Cardigan's light brigade as they chase the Russians – realises his mistake, but is killed by shrapnel as he attempts to warn Cardigan, who apparently ignores him.  This is 'The Charge of the Light Brigade'.

The Light Brigade, torn apart by the cannons, clashes briefly with the Russians and then retreats. With most of his force dead or wounded, Lord Cardigan who led his men valiantly, is ironically unharmed, but he immediately begins bickering with the other officers about who must take the blame for the disaster.

Richard Williams's animations appear in many scenes from the beginning to the end, providing an ironic counterpoint to the action. Modelled on contemporary cartoons, they reflect Victorian journalism by glorifying British might and its honourable act in helping the Ottomans in the war, though the charge notoriously ended in defeat. The film ends with a sketch drawing of a rotten dead horse of the light brigade.

Cast

 Trevor Howard as Lord Cardigan
 Vanessa Redgrave as Clarissa
 John Gielgud as Lord Raglan
 Harry Andrews as Lord Lucan
 Mark Burns as Captain Morris
 Jill Bennett as Mrs. Fanny Duberly
 David Hemmings as Captain Nolan
 Peter Bowles as Captain Duberly
 Mark Dignam as General Airey
 Leo Britt as General Scarlett
 Howard Marion-Crawford as Sir George Brown
 T. P. McKenna as William Howard Russell
 Corin Redgrave as Featherstonehaugh
 Alan Dobie as Mogg
 Ben Aris as Maxse
 Norman Rossington as Sergeant Major Corbett
 Willoughby Goddard as Squire
 Georges Douking as St. Arnaud
 Ambrose Coghill as Douglas
 Natasha Richardson as Flower girl at wedding (uncredited)
 Joely Richardson as Extra (uncredited)

Production

Writing
The screenplay was written by Charles Wood from a first draft (uncredited) by John Osborne. It aimed to be brutally authentic, based in part on the research in Cecil Woodham-Smith's The Reason Why (1953). The film included animations by Richard Williams, based on the 19th century graphic style of Punch magazine, to explain the political events surrounding the battle. The music score was by John Addison and the cinematography by David Watkin.

In 2002, Osborne's unproduced original script was reworked into a radio play for BBC Radio 4. The original airing featured Charles Dance as Cardigan, Donald Sinden as Lucan, Joseph Fiennes as Nolan, Alec McCowen as Raglan and Lynne Miller as Fanny Duberly.

Casting
Laurence Harvey had originally purchased the film rights for The Reason Why for his own production company and Joseph E. Levine. At the conclusion of a lengthy settlement in Richardson's favour, Harvey demanded a role in the film. He was given the role of Prince Radziwill, a Polish officer with the Heavy Brigade, but his part was edited out of the completed film.<ref>pp 35–36 Welsh, James Michael & Tibbetts, John C. The Cinema of Tony Richardson: Essays and Interviews SUNY Press, 1999</ref> This lawsuit led to a falling out between Tony Richardson and John Osborne, when the latter refused to alter his script for being too close to Woodham-Smith's book. Harvey is clearly visible in one scene that takes place in a London theatre and a performance of "Macbeth."

In his memoirs, Tony Richardson mentions approaching Rex Harrison to play Lord Cardigan. However, a newspaper erroneously reported that George C. Scott was being cast in the role. This news infuriated Harrison and he dropped out of the project, leaving Trevor Howard to be cast.

The director's daughters, Joely Richardson and Natasha Richardson, appeared in the film in very small uncredited roles.

Filming

The scene where troopers rush into position to salute Cardigan as he takes a morning walk with his dogs was shot at 6 Carlton House Terrace, St James's, London, a few doors along from the earl's actual London residence of 17 Carlton House Terrace. Other London street scenes were filmed in the Royal Naval Hospital, Greenwich. The Royal Mint, opposite the Tower of London, represented Horseguards, the headquarters of the Army.

The barracks scenes in the first half of the film were filmed at Beaumont Barracks in Aldershot in Hampshire, while the 'Crimea' scenes, including the Charge itself, were filmed in Turkey with the action sequences directed by Bob Simmons.

Release
The film had two Royal charity benefits, on Wednesday, 10 and Thursday 11 April (the first attended by Prince Philip) before opening at the Odeon Leicester Square.

Reception
The film was not screened to critics in advance of its release with Richardson writing to The Times newspaper criticizing English critics as "spoilt and demanding children" and that they were "the most personal, the most superficial and with the least good will in the world". Despite this, the film received generally positive reviews but proved a box office bomb.

The film was produced during a time of public frustration over the Vietnam War and during a period of anti-war sentiment.  It has been argued that in retrospect it can be seen as a warning against military interventions in other lands.

The Japanese filmmaker Akira Kurosawa cited this movie as one of his 100 favorite films.

AwardsThe Charge of the Light Brigade'' was nominated for seven BAFTA Film Awards, but failed to win in any category. 
Nominee Best Music Anthony Asquith Award (John Addison)
Nominee Best Actor BAFTA (Trevor Howard)
Nominee Best Art Direction BAFTA (Edward Marshall)
Nominee Best Cinematography BAFTA (David Watkin)
Nominee Best Costume Design BAFTA (David Walker)
Nominee Best Film Editing BAFTA (Kevin Brownlow)
Nominee Best Sound BAFTA (Simon Kaye)

Historical accuracy
For plot purposes, the film incorrectly portrays its protagonist Captain Nolan at the centre of the 'black bottle' affair, when Moselle wine was ordered for a guest rather than the champagne that Lord Cardigan had required. The wine was served in a black bottle, causing Cardigan to assume that the officers were consuming beer, a drink for enlisted men. The officer actually concerned was Captain John Reynolds.

In the film all of the Light Brigade regiments are outfitted with cherry coloured breeches when only the 11th Hussars wore breeches of that colour. Officers and troopers of the other four regiments wore dark blue breeches, with double yellow stripes, or in the case of the 17th Lancers, double white stripes. In one scene a single trooper of the 17th is correctly attired.

The film's depiction of the Battle of Balaclava shows the initial Russian attack on the redoubts and of course the Charge of the Light Brigade, but elides both the stand of the 93rd Sutherland Highlanders (the "Thin Red Line") and the Charge of the Heavy Brigade. According to director Tony Richardson, the Heavy Brigade scene was filmed but later cut at the studio's behest.

Likewise, Fanny Duberly is shown to be seduced by Lord Cardigan; although she was in the Crimea, she did not have an affair with Cardigan.

The film was criticised for presenting the impulsive and haughty Captain Louis Nolan in a generally positive light, as well portraying the adventurous Fanny Duberly as unfaithful and eager for carnage.

References

External links

 
 
 
 

1968 films
1960s historical films
1968 war films
British Empire war films
British historical films
British war epic films
Crimean War films
Films directed by Tony Richardson
Films scored by John Addison
Films set in 1854
Films set in Ukraine
Films with live action and animation
United Artists films
War films based on actual events
1960s English-language films
1960s British films